Joan of Paris is a 1942 war film about five Royal Air Force pilots shot down over Nazi-occupied France during World War II and their attempt to escape to England. It stars Michèle Morgan and Paul Henreid, with Thomas Mitchell, Laird Cregar and May Robson in her last role.

Joan of Paris marked the U.S. screen debuts of Austrian Henreid and Frenchwoman Morgan. Henreid had previously appeared in some British-American co-productions made in England and had starred on Broadway in the play Flight to the West as Paul von Hernreid. When he was signed with RKO in 1942, the studio changed his surname, dropping the "von" and changing his last name to "Henreid", the name he used for the rest of his film career.

Cregar was borrowed from 20th-Century Fox. Alan Ladd, who played one of the downed airmen, would soon become a star later that year. After his breakthrough starring role in This Gun for Hire (1942), Joan of Paris was re-released with Ladd more prominently featured.

Plot
1941. In German-occupied France, five downed RAF fliers make their way to Paris to seek help returning to England. Their leader, Paul (Paul Henreid), contacts a former mentor, Father Antoine (Thomas Mitchell), who agrees to hide them in his cathedral. Later, after eluding German agents, Paul enters a café. There, he meets with Joan (Michèle Morgan), introducing himself with a coded message from Father Antoine. As the film progresses, the two become close.

Later, Father Antoine obtains the name of a contact, a schoolteacher (May Robson) who agrees to a secret meeting with Joan, where she promises to arrange for a seaplane to land at night on the Seine River to pick up Paul and the fliers. However, Paul is subsequently arrested by the Gestapo for not carrying identification papers. But his interrogator, Herr Funk (Laird Cregar), apologizes for the inconvenience and releases him. Funk actually wishes to lull Paul into leading his agents to the other fliers. But that night, Paul discovers he is being followed.

Unable to shake the Gestapo agent who tails him, he contacts Joan. He asks her to deliver a map of the rendezvous point to his comrades, still hidden in Father Antoine's cathedral. Later, Paul finally eliminates his Gestapo tracker. But soon after, Joan is confronted by Funk in her flat. He offers her a devil's bargain: Paul's life, if she will lead him to the hiding place of the others. She agrees. Once in the cathedral, however, she double-crosses Funk and his soldiers, leading them on a wild goose chase through the Paris sewers. Thus, Paul and the fliers are allowed enough time to make their escape. In the film's final scene, Joan bravely faces a German firing squad.

Cast

 Michèle Morgan as Joan
 Paul Henreid as Paul Lavallier
 Thomas Mitchell as Father Antoine
 Laird Cregar as Herr Funk
 May Robson as Mademoiselle Rosay
 Alexander Granach as Gestapo Agent
 Alan Ladd as Baby
 Jack Briggs as Robin
 James Monks as Splinter
 Richard Fraser as Geoffrey

Production
The working title of this film was "Joan of Arc" and was the first war-themed film from RKO Radio Pictures. According to pre-production news items in The Hollywood Reporter, RKO considered Charles Boyer, Robert Morley and Jean Gabin for leads in the film. Producer David Hempstead wanted Julien Duvivier to direct the project because Gabin and Michele Morgan had worked with Duvivier in Europe. Lewis Milestone was initially assigned to direct the film but resigned over differences with the studio.

Joan of Paris used the largest single set constructed by the studio since the making of Hunchback of Notre Dame (1939). Principal photography took place from mid-September to late October 1941, and although ready for release in December 1941, RKO held the film back for an early 1942 release to capitalize on public interest in films about World War II.

Alan Ladd's performance helped him get cast in This Gun for Hire. Paul Henreid says that after working with Ladd he felt "Ladd couldn't die properly and Stevenson shot and reshot the episode. Ladd's eyes showed no expression. They were like glass balls no matter how much Stevenson worked on him." Henreid says he and Stevenson both predicted that out of the young men in the film it would be Dick Frazier who had the best chance of stardom.

Reception

Critical
Joan of Paris received a glowing review from film critic Bosley Crowther in The New York Times, " here is a tale of personal valor and selfless sacrifice which is told so simply and eloquently, and is so beautifully played that it might be a true re-enactment of a gallant episode. At least, it cheers the heart and stirs the pulse to think that it might be. "Joan of Paris' is a rigidly exciting and tenderly moving film. It will do as a tribute to high courage until the lamps of Paris burn once more."

Box office
Joan of Paris made a profit of $105,000, making it RKO's most successful film of the first half of 1942.

Accolades
Roy Webb was nominated for the Academy Award for Best Original Score.

References

References

Bibliography

 Jewell, Richard B. RKO Radio Pictures: A Titan Is Born. Oakland, California: University of California, 2012. .
 Jewell, Richard B. and Vernon Harbin. The RKO Story. New Rochelle, New York: Arlington House, 1982. .

External links

 
 
 
 

1942 films
1940s war drama films
American war drama films
American black-and-white films
1940s English-language films
Films scored by Roy Webb
Films about the French Resistance
Films about shot-down aviators
Films directed by Robert Stevenson
RKO Pictures films
American World War II films
World War II films made in wartime
1942 drama films